Museum of Fight for Estonia's Freedom is a privately owned museum in Lagedi, near Tallinn.  It specialises on exhibits of World War II battles on Estonian soil, or involving Estonian soldiers.

Monument of Lihula 

The museum is the current location of the Monument of Lihula.

External links 
 

History museums in Estonia
Rae Parish
Buildings and structures in Harju County
World War II museums